Materiel Command may refer to:

United States Army Materiel Command
Army Materiel Command (Denmark)
 Air Force Materiel Command, current major command of the United States Air Force
 Air Materiel Command, former command of the USAF and USAAF